Where Has Love Gone? is a studio album by Sofia Rotaru, recorded at Melodiya in the USSR. The album consists of soundtracks to the film Where Has Love Gone?.

Track listing

Languages of performance 
Songs are performed in Russian and Romanian languages.

See also 
 Where Has Love Gone? (song)

References

External links 
artvertep
Volodymyr Ivasyuk Official Fan-Club Site

1981 albums
Sofia Rotaru albums